The Novide River is a tributary of the south shore of Cabbage Willows Bay on the Ministikawatin Peninsula, in the James Bay Reserve, in the municipality of Eeyou Istchee Baie-James, in Jamésie, in the administrative region of Nord-du-Québec, in Quebec, Canada.

The surface of the river is usually frozen from early November to mid-May, however, safe ice circulation is generally from mid-November to mid-April.

Geography 
The hydrographic slopes adjacent to the Novide River are:
North side: Cabbage Willows Bay, Rupert Bay, James Bay, Inenw Passage;
East side: Rupert's Bay, Nottaway River, Broadback River;
South side: Iscouistic River, Missisicabi River, Octave River (Rupert Bay), Harricana River;
West side: Harricana River, Hannah Bay.

The course of the Novide River runs for  skirting the Nesukauchi hill on the West, according to the following segments:
 Northwest in marsh areas to Kachiskamisechishit Creek (from the South);
 westward into marsh areas by collecting Nistam Utameu Creek (coming from the South) and crossing  of sandstone at its mouth.

The mouth of the Little Missisicabi River is located on the flanks of the eastern shore of Hannah Bay, in Quebec, an appendage south of James Bay.

Toponymy
The term "Novide" is a name of French origin.

The toponym Novide River was formalized on December 5, 1968, at the Bank of Place Names of the Commission de toponymie du Québec, i.e. at the creation of this Commission.

See also 

List of rivers of Quebec

Notes and references 

Rivers of Nord-du-Québec
Tributaries of James Bay